Kevin Danczak is an American rock guitarist and perhaps best known for being the guitarist in 1990s pop punk band Size 14.

Career

Size 14
Before Size 14's lineup was fully formed, Kevin Danczak was Size 14's singer, Linus Of Hollywood's roommate and joined the band shortly after Linus and bassist Robt Ptak started working together.  Danczak was in the band until their break up in 1998.

Captain Genius
After Size 14, Kevin Danczak went on to work as a studio musician and performed and wrote in several music projects. Notably, Captain Genius, a Los Angeles-based power pop band who were described by "Not Lame.com" as "Part Fountains Of Wayne, part early Weezer, early Supergrass and Nada Surf and plenty of new wave power poppin` charm!". They released two albums entitled, Captain Genius and Captain Genius II, where on the latter, Danczak played guitar, bass, was a contributing writer/arranger and co-produced the album with the band. Captain Genius dissolved in 2007.

Bands

Discography

Size 14
 Size 14 (1997)

Captain Genius
 Captain Genius (2002)
 Captain Genius II (2006)

References

External links
 Kevin Danczak Discogs Profile
 Kevin Danczak Musicbrainz Profile
 Kevin Danczak Profile on old Size 14 site
 Captain Genius CD Review

American pop guitarists
American male bass guitarists
Living people
Place of birth missing (living people)
21st-century American guitarists
Year of birth missing (living people)
21st-century American male musicians